Sigmatanthus is a monotypic genus of flowering plants belonging to the family Rutaceae. The only species is Sigmatanthus trifoliatus.

The species is found in Northern and Northeastern Brazil.

References

Zanthoxyloideae
Zanthoxyloideae genera
Monotypic Rutaceae genera